Nancy Naples may refer to:

 Nancy Naples (politician), American government official in New York
 Nancy Naples (sociologist), American sociologist